In mathematics, the James embedding is an embedding of a real, complex, or hyperbolic projective space into a sphere, introduced by .

References
https://en.wikipedia.org/wiki/James_embedding

Algebraic topology